Eve Hall (1937-2007) was a German-South African anti-apartheid activist, gypsy journalist, and development worker. She lived at Matumi, Nelspruit, South Africa with her husband, Tony Hall.

Early life 
Hall was a survivor of the war in France and a Jewish refugee who was born to a Jewish father and German mother. She went to Witwatersrand University and Reading University, where she became an M.A. graduate. Hall met Tony at Witwatersrand University and together became Gypsy journalists and development workers. Hall married Tony and had three sons Philip, Andy, and Christopher. In 1964, Hall, Tony, and their sons were banned from returning to South Africa as they were listed members of banned organizations.

Career 
Hall was the women's editor of the Daily Nation, one of the most significant national daily papers in Kenya. The couple worked in places such as London, Oxford, Nairobi, Delhi, and a few more. She was Oxfam's information officer in Delhi, India and launched the ANC women section at Dar es Salaam, Tanzania. Hall was a Chief Technical Officer of the ILO (International Labour Organization) in Somalia and helped in solving issues related to gender inequalities.

Hall returned to South Africa in 1991 when apartheid ended. She died of breast cancer in 2007 at the age of 70.

References 

1937 births
2007 deaths
Jewish South African anti-apartheid activists
University of the Witwatersrand alumni
Alumni of the University of Reading
South African journalists
Deaths from breast cancer
People from Mbombela
20th-century journalists
White South African anti-apartheid activists